Joaquin Rocks are a group of three pillars of rock, originally known as "Las Tres Piedras" (The Three Rocks), located on Joaquin Ridge, in the Diablo Range, in Fresno County, California. The three pillars of rock are clearly visible on the ridge for many miles from many directions in the San Joaquin Valley and from their summits have a view of much of the valley.

History 
The rocks were named for Joaquin Murietta (1830-1853), a Sonoran 49'er turned bandit during the California Gold Rush after his death at the hands of the California Rangers in the Arroyo de Cantua. He and his gang used this region as a base and a refuge for their business of horse theft and robbery.  The Rocks themselves were used as a lookout, overlooking the approaches to their rancho in the Arroyo de Cantua.

References 

Landforms of Fresno County, California
Diablo Range